Rally Cry may refer to:

 Rally Cry (album) by Arkells, 2018
 Rally Cry (novel) by William R. Forstchen, 1990